Josephus Schenk (born 19 August 1980, in Zutphen) is a former Dutch professional darts player.

Career

Schenk began playing in the Professional Darts Corporation made his PDC World Darts Championship debut in 2005 where he defeated American Darin Young in the first round and Alan Caves in the second round before defeating Peter Manley in the round three stage. His run was ended though in the Last 16 stage by Andy Hamilton. In the 2007 PDC World Darts Championship, Schenk was beaten in the first round by Dennis Priestley. This was followed by an appearance in the 2007 UK Open but was beaten early in the competition by Geoff Harkup.

In 2008, Schenk began playing in the Nederlandse Darts Bond, an affiliation of the British Darts Organisation and in 2009 he began playing in the BDO/WDF circuit.

In 2019, Schenk rejoined playing in the BDO on Dutch Open Men's Pairs with Derk Telnekes and who losing to the Quarter Finals are Gino Vos and Berry van Peer to Netherlands.

World Championship Results

PDC

 2005: 4th Round (lost to Andy Hamilton 1–4)
 2007: 1st Round (lost to Dennis Priestley 0–3)

External links
 Website
 Profile and stats on Darts Database

1980 births
Living people
Dutch darts players
People from Zutphen
Sportspeople from Gelderland
Professional Darts Corporation associate players